Hickson is an unincorporated community in Cass County, in the U.S. state of North Dakota.

History
Hickson was laid out in 1883 when the railroad was extended to that point. A post office called Hickson was established in 1884, and remained in operation until 1975. The community was named for Ole Hicks, a pioneer settler.

References

Unincorporated communities in Cass County, North Dakota
Unincorporated communities in North Dakota